Naoisha McAloon (born 17 March 1999) is an Irish footballer who plays as a goalkeeper for Women's Championship club Durham and for the Republic of Ireland national team.

Club career

Early career
McAloon played for Castleknock Celtic at youth level and attended Matt Gregg's Just4Keepers coaching school in Blanchardstown.

Peamount United
McAloon played for Peamount United from 2016 to 2022. In 2017, her team won second place after a defeat by Shelbourne in the Women's National League Cup. In 2018, her team won against Wexford Youths to win the WNL Cup title.

Peamount signed Niamh Reid Burke in 2018 and she shared the club's goalkeeping position with McAloon thereafter. The club were Women's National League Champions in 2019 and McAloon was named in the WNL Team of the Season, although Reid Burke played in the decisive 8–1 win over Cork City and the 2019 FAI Cup final defeat by Wexford Youths. 

The duo continued to rotate the starting goalkeeping position as Peamount United secured a League and Cup "double" in their 2020 campaign. Reid Burke was preferred as Peamount beat Cork City 6–0 in the 2020 FAI Women's Cup Final and for November's UEFA Women's Champions League fixture with Scottish Women's Premier League club Glasgow City, which was lost on penalties after a 0–0 draw.

In 2021 the goalkeeper rotation continued, with McAloon chosen to start the 5–2 UWCL defeat by ŽFK Spartak Subotica in August 2021.

Durham
In January 2022, McAloon switched to Durham. In October 2022 she made two saves as Durham upset Women's Super League club Manchester United on a penalty shootout in the 2022–23 FA Women's League Cup.

International career

Junior
McAloon represented Ireland at youth level while she attended Ratoath College. She progressed to represent the Republic of Ireland national under-17 team and later the Republic of Ireland national under-19 team.

While enrolled at Technological University Dublin, McAloon was part of the Ireland Universities squad at the 2019 Summer Universiade.

Senior
She received her first call-up to the senior Irish national team in June 2022.

References

External links 

Living people
1999 births
Durham W.F.C. players
Peamount United F.C. players
Republic of Ireland women's youth international footballers
Women's National League (Ireland) players
Association footballers from County Dublin
Republic of Ireland expatriate association footballers
Expatriate women's footballers in England
Irish expatriate sportspeople in England
Women's Championship (England) players
Association football goalkeepers
Women's association football goalkeepers
Republic of Ireland women's association footballers